1992 is an AD year.

1992 may also refer to:

1992 (number)
1992 (album), by The Game (2016)
1992 (EP), by Destiny Frasqueri
1992 (TV series), an Italian political drama television series (2015)
1992 – The Love Album, by Carter the Unstoppable Sex Machine (1992)